Lennon Lacy was a student attending West Bladen High School, in Bladenboro, North Carolina. On August 29, 2014, at age 17, he was found dead, hanging from the frame of a swing set in the center of a mobile home community. The death was initially declared a suicide by North Carolina's Chief Medical Examiner, but Lacy's family believed that he had been lynched. Lacy, who was black, had been dating a white woman, who also believed Lacy had been murdered, and who claimed neighbors had warned her that their interracial relationship was "not right". In December 2014, the FBI announced it would investigate. In June 2016, the conclusion of the FBI investigation was announced, having found "no evidence to pursue federal criminal civil rights charges".

Documentary
The death of Lacy is the central event in a documentary on lynching in America, Always in Season, shown at the Sundance Film Festival in January, 2019, where it won the special jury award for moral urgency. Ed Pilkington wrote in The Guardian that the film "is both a homage to Lennon Lacy and a critique of America’s rotten racial core, weaving the two together through an exploration of blurred memory, denial, obfuscation, betrayal and loss."

See also
List of unsolved deaths

References

External links
 Trailer for Always in Season
 Democracy Now documentary on Always in Season
 FBI Vault released documents

August 2014 events in the United States
Deaths by hanging
Deaths by person in North Carolina
People from Bladen County, North Carolina
2014 in North Carolina
Racially motivated violence against African Americans